Northwest Suburban Conference may refer to:

 Northwest Suburban Conference (Illinois)
 Northwest Suburban Conference (Minnesota)